Gach Sar (also Romanized as Gach-i-Sar and Getschesar) is a village in Nesa Rural District, Asara District, Karaj County, Alborz Province, Iran. At the 2006 census, its population was 133, in 35 families. Located on the main road from Tehran to Chalus on the Caspian coast, 7 km south of the Kandavan Tunnel, Gach Sar has farmlands irrigated by the Karaj River, producing fruits, as well as plants for animal fodder.

Gach Sar has a gypsum mine, and a hotel built during the reign of Reza Shah Pahlavi as a royal lodge. The Qajar-era monarch Naser al-Din Shah vacationed here twice.

Wildlife 
Naturally occurring local plants include marjoram, bugloss, and marshmallows. Wild animals include jackals, wolves, foxes, boars, and bears.

References 

Populated places in Karaj County